New York Canyon Falls is a waterfall in the Tahoe National Forest in the Sierra Nevada, Placer County, California. The falls are an approximately  vertical drop on New York Canyon Creek, a tributary of the North Fork American River. There is no trail leading to the falls, although they are accessible by a difficult scramble.

East Snow Mountain Falls is nearby.

See also
List of waterfalls of California

References

Waterfalls of California
Landforms of Placer County, California